Sigafoos is a surname. Notable people with the surname include:

Frank Sigafoos (1904–1968), American baseball player
Jeff Sigafoos, New Zealand professor of educational psychology